The 2014 Torneo de Transición or Torneo Doctor Ramón Carrillo was the 124th season of top-flight professional football in Argentina. The season was scheduled to start on August 1, 2014 but was postponed after the death of Julio Grondona, president of the AFA on July 30. Finally, it began on August 8, 2014 and ended on December 14, 2014. Originally the last match of the tournament was scheduled on December 7 but as River Plate played the finals of the 2014 Copa Sudamericana the matches Racing-Godoy Cruz and River Plate-Quilmes were played on December 14. Twenty teams competed in the league, seventeen returning from the 2013–14 season and three promoted from the 2013–14 Primera B Nacional (Championship winners Banfield, runners-up Defensa y Justicia, and 3rd place Independiente).

Colón, Argentinos Juniors and All Boys had been relegated to the Primera B Nacional championship in the previous season.

Format 
The team with most points was the champion and qualified for the 2015 Copa Libertadores group stage.

No teams were relegated this season as the league was expanded to 30 teams in the new 2015 Primera División.

Club information

Managerial changes 

Interim Managers
1.  Fabián Castro was interim manager in the 6th round.
2. Interim manager, but later promoted to full-time manager.
3. Interim manager.
4. Interim manager.

International qualification 
Argentina had 6 berths in the 2015 Copa Libertadores (The first 4 berths were for the second stage and the last 2 for the first stage). San Lorenzo (Argentina 1), and River Plate (Argentina 2), were qualified as the 2014 Copa Libertadores and the 2014 Torneo Final champions, respectively. The Torneo de Transición champions (Racing) obtained the Argentina 3 berth. The Argentina 4 berth was awarded to the 2013–14 Primera División aggregate table best team not yet qualified (Boca Juniors). The 2015 Copa Libertadores first stage berths (Argentina 5 and Argentina 6) were awarded via 2013–14 Copa Argentina (Huracán) and via 2014 Copa Sudamericana (Estudiantes (LP)), respectively.

Argentina had 7 berths in the 2015 Copa Sudamericana. River Plate was qualified as the 2014 Copa Sudamericana champions. The other 6 berths were awarded to the 5 best teams of the Torneo de Transición if they are not qualified for 2015 Copa Libertadores second stage and the 2014 Supercopa Argentina champions, Huracán.

Standings

Results

Season statistics

Top goalscorers

Top Assists

Source: soccerway.com

References 

1
Argentine Primera División seasons